Asimutbreen Glacier is a small, steep tributary glacier to Vangengeym Glacier, descending southeast and then northeast between Solhogdene Heights and Skuggekammen Ridge, in the eastern Gruber Mountains of the Wohlthat Mountains, Queen Maud Land. It was discovered and plotted from air photos by the Third German Antarctic Expedition, 1938–39, replotted from air photos and from surveys by the Sixth Norwegian Antarctic Expedition, 1956–60, and named Asimutbreen (the azimuth glacier).

See also
 List of glaciers in the Antarctic
 Glaciology

References

 

Glaciers of Queen Maud Land
Princess Astrid Coast